Julian D. Alford (born 1963) is a retired United States Marine Corps major general who last served as the Commanding General of the Marine Corps Training Command from 2021 to 2022. Previously, he served as the Commanding General of the Marine Corps Installations East and Marine Corps Base Camp Lejeune from August 7, 2017, to June 4, 2021.

References

External links

Living people
Place of birth missing (living people)
United States Marine Corps generals
1963 births